Schefferville Airport  is located adjacent to the community of Schefferville, Quebec, Canada.

Airlines and destinations

See also
Schefferville/Squaw Lake Water Aerodrome

References

External links
Transport Canada - Schefferville Airport Information

Certified airports in Côte-Nord